This is a list of members of the Victorian Legislative Council from the elections of 12 September 1895 to the elections of 10 September 1896. No seats were contested in the elections of 13 September 1894.

From 1889 there were fourteen Provinces and a total of 48 members.

Note the "Term in Office" refers to that members term(s) in the Council, not necessarily for that Province.

William Zeal was President of the Council, Frank Dobson was Chairman of Committees.

 Grey left the Council in July 1896; replaced by Henry Wrixon, sworn-in August 1896.

References

 Re-member (a database of all Victorian MPs since 1851).

Members of the Parliament of Victoria by term
19th-century Australian politicians